No-One Cares About Your Creative Hub So Get Your Fuckin' Hedge Cut is the fourteenth album by Wirral-based rock band Half Man Half Biscuit, released on 18 May 2018 on Probe Plus Records. It is the highest-charting album in the band's history, reaching UK #33.

The track "Every Time A Bell Rings" begins with the line "Ground control to Monty Don", mixing the opening words of David Bowie's "Space Oddity" with the Gardener's World presenter.

Track listing

Charts

References

External links 
 

2018 albums
Half Man Half Biscuit albums